The Shiv Mandir, Maharashtra is a temple located in Vangaon village in the  Palghar district of Maharashtra, India. A long history that is associated with divine religious destinations describes about creation of outer building long back in 80's. It is situated at the distance of 100 m from Railway station of Vangaon, 130 km. away from Mumbai city towards Gujarat and 60 km. away from Vapi towards Mumbai. The divine Shiva Linga situated inside the main building is associated with many historical stories and is considered to be swayambhu (naturally available and prayed since ancient times).

Local Tribal people describe about long prevailing ancient stories associated with the Shiva Linga situated in the Garbhgruah of the temple.

The temple is overcrowded during many occasions like Mahashivratri. There is a fair for mahashivratri festival.

The temple becomes overcrowded again in the month of Shravan to get blessings from Shiv Pooja like Rudrabhishek, Parthiv Ling Pooja, Akhand Ramayan Path, Nava Parayan (ramcharitmanas), Masparayan (Ramcharitmanas) and other Religious Events.

Transport 
Shiv Mandir is located in Vangaon, 55 km north to Virar on the western railway lines of Mumbai Suburban Railway Network. Shiv Mandir is located at walking distance from Vangaon railway Station towards west.

History 
Shiv Mandir, Vangaon existed long since ancient times with only Shiva Linga situated and prayed by local tribal people, but without any proper constructed temple building. The temple building was reestablished by Thakur family and other local family of Vangaon in 19th century. Many stories, which are associated and narrated by old tribal peoples to their siblings, describe about Shiv Ling and temple.

Temple 
Shiv Mandir is the main attraction in Palghar District. According to tribal ancestral stories, the shiv ling was formed at the time in Treta Yuga, when Lord Shiva transformed himself to the form of madari to take Hanuman to meet Lord Ram in his childhood. The shiva linga was then observed by an old Brahmin and was prayed and preached by his family. Since long time, the divine Shiva Linga situated in temple is believed to fulfill desired wishes.

External links 
 

Palghar district